2201 Oljato, provisional designation , is a stony and extremely eccentric active asteroid and sizable near-Earth object of the Apollo group, approximately 2 kilometers in diameter.

Discovery 

Oljato was discovered by American astronomer Henry L. Giclas at the U.S Lowell Observatory in Flagstaff, Arizona, on 12 December 1947. After its discovery, this near-Earth Apollo asteroid became a lost asteroid for 32 years and was recovered under the provisional designation , by the American astronomers Passey and Bus at the Californian Palomar Observatory in 1979.

Orbit and classification 

Oljato is a member of the Apollo asteroids, a subgroup of near-Earth asteroids which cross the orbit of Earth. It orbits the Sun at a distance of 0.6–3.7 AU once every 3 years and 3 months (1,172 days). Its orbit has an eccentricity of 0.71 and an inclination of 3° with respect to the ecliptic.

It was a target of Hubble search for transition comets, a spectroscopic study involving amateur astronomers and the use of the Hubble Space Telescope. The asteroid belongs to the Taurid Complex (also see Taurids), a group of near-Earth asteroids thought to be extinct cometary nuclei, that are associated with four meteor showers on Earth, due to their disintegration. The Taurid Complex includes several other Apollo asteroids such as 4183 Cuno, 4341 Poseidon, 5143 Heracles, and 5731 Zeus.

Close approaches 

Due to the eccentricity of its orbit, Earth is not the only planet it passes. In 2044 it will pass close to Venus (on 24 Apr at 0.08 AU) as well as Earth (on 30 May at 0.129 AU), and in 2046 it will pass Jupiter (on 15 Jan at 1.4 AU). However, although it crosses the orbit of Mars, it will pass Earth, Venus and Jupiter several times before the next notable close approach to Mars, which will not be until 30 July 2127, passing at a nominal distance of

Physical characteristics 

Oljato has a rotation period of 26 hours. The stony asteroid is classified as a Sq-subtype in the SMASS taxonomic scheme, with a geometric albedo of 0.24. An alternative and exceptionally high albedo of 0.43 was determined by 11 observations from the Infrared Astronomical Satellite, IRAS.

Naming 

This minor planet was named after the Oljato–Monument Valley in Utah, on the Navajo Indian Reservation. The official naming citation was published by the Minor Planet Center on 28 March 1983.

Notes

References

External links 
 Search for meteor showers associated with Near-Earth Asteroids – P. B. Babadzhanov, 2001
 Asteroid Lightcurve Database (LCDB), query form (info )
 Dictionary of Minor Planet Names, Google books
 Asteroids and comets rotation curves, CdR – Observatoire de Genève, Raoul Behrend
 
 
 

002201
002201
Discoveries by Henry L. Giclas
002201
Named minor planets
002201
002201
19471212